Cadwalader, Wickersham & Taft LLP (known as Cadwalader) is a white-shoe law firm, and is New York City's oldest law firm and one of the oldest continuously operating legal practices in the United States. Attorney John Wells founded the practice in 1792. Cadwalader's Lower Manhattan headquarters is one of five offices in three countries. In 2022, the firm had approximately 400 attorneys.

Overview
New York City's oldest law firm, Cadwalader, Wickersham & Taft is headquartered at 200 Liberty Street in Lower Manhattan. The firm's managing partner, Patrick Quinn, oversees approximately 400 attorneys as of 2022. It operates out of five offices across the United States and Europe. In addition to its Wall Street location, Cadwalader, Wickersham & Taft has offices in Washington, D.C., Charlotte, London and Dublin. In 2021, Cadwalader generated $608.9 million in revenue, with profits per partner of $4.38 million.

History
In 1792, attorney John Wells, a Princeton graduate who was one of approximately 80 lawyers in New York City at the time, founded the law firm that ultimately became known as Cadwalader, Wickersham & Taft. The firm became a partnership called Wells & Strong in 1818 when George Washington Strong joined Wells' practice.

Wells' death in 1823 prompted Strong to bring in George Griffin as partner. Griffin then left in 1838 and George Washington Strong partnered with Marshall Bidwell. George Washington Strong's son, George Templeton Strong, a lawyer and noted diarist, joined the firm in 1844. The firm became known as Strong, Bidwell & Strong. The firm became Bidwell & Strong in 1855 after George Washington Strong's death. Charles E. Strong, George Templeton Strong's cousin, became the firm's chief in the 1870s. During his tenure, he considered shuttering the firm and moving from law to banking. In 1878, Strong partnered with John Lambert Cadwalader, who was assistant secretary of state during President Ulysses S. Grant's administration.

Corporate law and civic responsibility
George Washington Strong established the first Bank for Savings for the City of New York in 1816. Shipping, transportation and real estate matters handled on behalf of John Jacob Astor involved Strong in the legal work necessary to establish New York City's first public library in 1849. If you follow Cadwalader's historical thread, you will find your way to John Cadwalader, who orchestrated the legal work necessary to establish The New York Public Library.

As an attorney for Philip Schuyler, George Templeton Strong provided legal assistance to Eliza Schuyler Hamilton in establishing the Orphan Asylum Society. In 1848, the firm established the New York Association for Improving the Condition of the Poor and advised The Association for the Prevention of Cruelty to Animals.  In 1861, George T. Strong established the United States Sanitary Committee, a forerunner to the American Red Cross, which raised more than $5 million for Union soldiers in need of medical care.  Strong's cousin and law partner Charles went on to oversee the establishment of the New York Medical College & Hospital for Women and Children.

George T. Strong assisted with the development of Columbia Law in 1858, and, in 1870, George T. Strong and John Cadwalader were Charter Members of the Association of the Bar of the City of New York – which grew into the ABA in 1878. Joined by George Wickersham, who would become U.S. Attorney General in 1909, and Henry Waters Taft, the law firm that would become Cadwalader, Wickersham & Taft always believed that it would be dedicated to corporate law and civic duty.  Cadwalader also named the first female partner to what is considered to be a "Wall Street Law Firm."

In 1921, George Wickersham became a founder and Chairman of the Board of the Council on Foreign Relations.  It was 1921 that also saw the establishment of the relationship between Cadwalader and The Salvation Army, a business and service relationship that continues to this day.  In the 1960s, the firm represented Margaret Sanger, the founder of the birth control movement, and her Margaret Sanger Research Bureau, which merged with Planned Parenthood in 1973.

George W. Wickersham, an antitrust lawyer, joined the firm in 1883 and made partner in 1887. Wickersham was named U.S. Attorney General under President William Howard Taft. Henry W. Taft, President Taft's brother, began working at Cadwalader in 1889. He became partner in 1899 and served as special assistant to the U.S. Attorney General from 1905 to 1907. The firm became known as Cadwalader, Wickersham & Taft in 1914.

In the 1930s, Cadwalader was involved with the custody trial determining the guardianship of Gloria Vanderbilt. Catherine Noyes Lee became Cadwalader's first female partner in 1942.

Cadwalader expanded its footprint as the firm opened an office in Charlotte, North Carolina, in 1996,  established a London presence in 1997 and opened its first office in China—in Beijing—in 2005.

In the mid-1990s, a group of young partners formed what some at Cadwalader referred to as Project Rightsize, an effort from 1994 to 1995 to remove less productive partners. The group shuttered Cadwalader's office in Palm Beach, Florida, and reduced a branch in Los Angeles, California. In all, 17 partners, nearly 20 percent, left the firm. Critics said the move was driven by individuals' financial interests and two former partners successfully sued Cadwalader, Wickersham & Taft for violating its partnership agreement.

Following the September 11, 2001, terror attacks, Cadwalader assisted families of those killed, including immigrant families. A portion of the firm's post-9/11 work occurred when attorneys learned there was no central resource for families seeking benefits; as a result, Cadwalader lawyers put together the "Handbook of Public and Private Assistance Resources for the Victims and Families of the World Trade Center Attacks", which was released in November 2001. The firm released an expanded version the following year.  Cadwalader also represented Nobel Prize laureate Malala Yousafzai, helping her negotiate and establish The Malala Fund after the assassination attempt by the Taliban.

During the financial crisis of 2007–2008, Cadwalader reduced its number of lawyers by about 20 percent in 2008. A reporter for The Wall Street Journal suggested the move was meant to lower operating costs as demand for its services decreased. Then-Chairman W. Christopher White stated, "There was a bubble, we rode that bubble, it contracted, and we adjusted". Also during the fiscal crisis, Cadwalader attorneys served as advisers for the U.S. Treasury as Chrysler and General Motors restructured. Cadwalader expanded in China with a Hong Kong office in 2010. In 2011, it opened offices in Houston and Brussels.

In 2013, James C. Woolery left JP Morgan Chase for Cadwalader, Wickersham & Taft. The next year, Woolery was selected to take over as the firm's new chairman starting in 2015. In January 2015, when the chairman-elect was slated to take the chairman's post, the firm announced Woolery had left Cadwalader, Wickersham & Taft to launch a hedge fund. The firm eliminated the chairman position and Managing Partner Patrick Quinn began overseeing the firm.

Areas of practice
Cadwalader's practices cover varying areas of law, including: antitrust, capital markets, corporate, energy and commodities, finance, financial restructuring, financial services, health care/not-for-profit, intellectual property, litigation, tax and private wealth, and white collar defense and investigations. The firm has long-standing client relationships with premier financial institutions, Fortune 500 companies, government entities, charitable and health care organizations, and private clients. The firm also takes on pro bono assignments, providing attorneys for non-profit organizations, including those assisting women, children and immigrants.

One of the firm's highest-profile pro bono clients was Nobel laureate Malala Yousafzai.  Cadwalader began representing the female education activist in 2012, while she was seventeen years old and still hospitalized by a Taliban shooting. The firm continued to represent her for two years, ultimately establishing the Malala Fund, a nonprofit organization advocating for women's access to education.

Rankings and recognition
Law associates surveyed for the Vault 100 law firm rankings placed Cadwalader, Wickersham & Taft at No. 56 on its 2022 list of most prestigious firms to work for. Also in 2015, U.S. News & World Report named Cadwalader, Wickersham & Taft "Law Firm of the Year" for derivatives and futures law. Cadwalader was ranked No. 1 on the Commercial Mortgage Alert's top issuer counsel and top underwriter counsel tables for commercial mortgage-backed securities in 2015. Additionally, the firm has received recognition for its business culture and diversity.

In 2021, The American Lawyer ranked Cadwalader, Wickersham & Taft No. 85 on the Am Law 100, an annual ranking of U.S. firms by gross revenue. The publication also classified Cadwalader as one of only twenty-four "Superrich Firms" in the United States, categorized as those generating at least $1 million in revenue per lawyer and $2 million in profits per partner.

See also
 List of largest United States-based law firms by profits per partner
 White shoe firms

References

External links

Firm Profile at the National Law Review 

Law firms established in 1792
Law firms based in New York City
Insolvency and corporate recovery firms
1792 establishments in New York (state)